This is a list of resignations from the Second government formed by Prime Minister Theresa May. After forming a Conservative minority government on 11 June 2017, Theresa May faced a significant number of front bench resignations. These included 16 departures from the Cabinet, including three from the Great Offices of State. She experienced 60 ministerial departures with 42 of these being resignations due to disunity regarding Brexit discord. Lastly, Theresa May herself resigned on 24 July 2019, with Boris Johnson being appointed Prime Minister by Queen Elizabeth II shortly after.

Context and implications for government 

The pace and amount of resignations was described as 'unprecedented' by the Institute for Government, with resignations impacting the civil functioning of the government. For example, in March 2019 fifteen posts had been left vacant due to resignations and a lack of MPs willing to fill positions. Secretary of State for Work and Pensions Amber Rudd had to take on Sarah Newton's responsibilities as Minister of State for Disabled People as the position was left unfilled two weeks after her resignation. In less than three years, Theresa May saw more resignations than Thatcher or Blair. The resignations also occurred amid a break down of cabinet collective responsibility, with Chief Whip Julian Smith describing May's Cabinet as exhibiting the 'worst cabinet ill-discipline in history', as well as various MPs resigning the whip, including three to join The Independent Group of MPs.

2017

2018

2019

See also
 2018 British cabinet reshuffle
 List of departures from the first Johnson ministry
 List of departures from the second Johnson ministry
 List of departures from the Truss ministry

References

Notes

2017 in British politics
2018 in British politics
Theresa May
Consequences of the 2016 United Kingdom European Union membership referendum
History of the Conservative Party (UK)
Lists of departures from the British government by Ministry